Onkar Dattaram Gurav (born  29 June 1988, in Mumbai) is an Indian cricketer who plays for Mumbai. He is right-hand wicket-keeper batsman

References

External links
 

1989 births
Living people
Indian cricketers
Mumbai cricketers
Cricketers from Mumbai
Wicket-keepers